Obeidia gigantearia is a moth of the  family Geometridae. It is found in Taiwan and China.

Subspecies
Obeidia gigantearia gigantearia
Obeidia gigantearia longimacula Wehrli, 1939
Obeidia gigantearia marginifascia Prout, 1914 (Taiwan)

References

Ennominae
Moths described in 1897
Moths of Asia
Moths of Taiwan